was a Japanese daimyō of the Edo period, who served the Tokugawa clan. Masamitsu was the son of Hoshina Masanao, and after having lent his support to Tokugawa Ieyasu at the 1600 Battle of Sekigahara, he was given the Takatō fief in 1600.  

With his father's death the following year in Takatō, Masamitsu became the new head of the Hoshina clan and served throughout the Osaka Campaigns of 1614 and 1615. Masamitsu was later privileged with the adoption of Tokugawa Hidetada's fourth son Komatsu, the future Hoshina Masayuki. His childhood name was Jinshiro (甚四郎).

Family
 Father: Hoshina Masanao
 Mother: Atobeshi-dono
 Wife: daughter of Sanada Masayuki
 Adopted Sons:
 Hoshina Masasada
 Hoshina Masashige
 Hoshina Masayuki
 Sanada Sagenta

References

Noguchi Shin'ichi (2005). Aizu-han. (Tokyo: Gendai shokan)

|-

Samurai
Daimyo
1561 births
1631 deaths
Hoshina clan